Washington Rodriguez (born 12 January 1970) is a former Uruguayan professional footballer who played as a midfielder in Uruguay and the United States.

Career
Rodriguez played five seasons with Liverpool F.C. of the Uruguayan Primera División for five seasons before joining the Dallas Burn of the American Major League Soccer for their inaugural season in 1996. During his time with the Dallas Burn Rodriguez played in 14 matches and scored 4 goals in his only season with the club.

References

External links 
 

1970 births
Living people
Footballers from Montevideo
Uruguayan footballers
Association football midfielders
Uruguayan Primera División players
Liverpool F.C. (Montevideo) players
Major League Soccer players
FC Dallas players
S.L. Benfica footballers
Club Nacional de Football players
Uruguay youth international footballers
Uruguay under-20 international footballers
Expatriate footballers in Portugal
Expatriate soccer players in the United States

Uruguayan expatriate sportspeople in Portugal